Walter George Phillip Edward (6 April 1899 – 21 January 1967) was an Australian rules footballer who played with Essendon in the Victorian Football League (VFL).

Notes

External links 
		

1899 births
1967 deaths
Australian rules footballers from Victoria (Australia)
Essendon Football Club players
Essendon Association Football Club players